Jack Waltzer ( since 1967) is an American acting coach and actor.

Biography
Waltzer is a lifetime member of the Actors Studio and trained with educators of the Stanislavsky method such as Stella Adler, Sanford Meisner, Lee Strasberg, and Uta Hagen.

He coaches actors both in North America and Europe, with master classes in cities such as Paris. His students have included Dustin Hoffman, Sigourney Weaver, Sharon Stone, Julie Gayet, and David Atrakchi.

In a Los Angeles Times article, Weaver credited "her newfound range with a process that began after Roman Polanski introduced her to uber-acting coach Jack Waltzer in Paris in 1993."

Dustin Hoffman personally called Waltzer to request shooting his acting class for a scene in the film Tootsie.

Documentary
The 2011 documentary Jack Waltzer: On the Craft of Acting, directed by Antoine Levannier, Christophe Dimitri Réveille, Joëlle Séchaud, and Juan Diego Solanas, pays tribute to Waltzer and his teaching and includes interviews with actors such as James Caan, Jon Voight, Elsa Zylberstein, Tomer Sisley.

The film was broadcast on French television under the title Jack Waltzer un des grands maitres américains de l'art dramatique

References

External links

Jack Waltzer Official Website

Living people
American acting coaches
Year of birth missing (living people)